Carlsbad Municipal School District, also known as Carlsbad Municipal Schools, is a school district in Carlsbad, New Mexico, United States.

Governance
The CMS superintendent is Dr. Greg Rodriguez.

The Board of Education is made up of:
David Shoup, President
Andrew Harris, Vice President
Simon Rubio, Secretary
Abel Montoya
Ron Singleton

Service area
In addition to Carlsbad, the district includes: Happy Valley, La Huerta, Livingston Wheeler, Malaga, and Whites City.

Schools

Pre-elementary schools
Hillcrest
Early Childhood Education Center

Elementary schools
Craft Elementary School
Joe Stanley Smith Elementary School
Monterrey Elementary School
It was remodeled in 2022.
Desert Willow Elementary School
Ocotillo Elementary School
Sunset Elementary School

Middle schools
Carlsbad Sixth Grade Academy
Carlsbad Intermediate School

High schools
Carlsbad High School
Carlsbad Early College High School

Charter schools
Jefferson Montessori Academy
Pecos Connections Academy

See also

Education in New Mexico

References

External links
 Carlsbad Municipal School District
 Carlsbad Municipal School District (Archive)
 Carlsbad Municipal School District (Archive)
 New Mexico Public Education Department

Education in Eddy County, New Mexico
School districts in New Mexico
Carlsbad, New Mexico